Hendrik Lieuwe Tolman (born 16 January 1961, in Leeuwarden) is the original developer of the WAVEWATCH III (tm) wind wave model.

He has been the branch chief for the Marine Modeling and Analysis Branch in the US National Weather Service of NOAA since 2007, having joined the branch in 1992.

References

1961 births
Living people
Dutch civil engineers
American civil engineers
Dutch oceanographers
Delft University of Technology alumni
National Oceanic and Atmospheric Administration personnel
People from Leeuwarden
Dutch emigrants to the United States